Pachydactylus mariquensis, also known as the common banded gecko, Ceres thick-toed gecko, or Marico thick-toed gecko,  is a species of lizard in the family Gekkonidae. It is endemic to South Africa and Namibia.

References

Pachydactylus
Reptiles of South Africa
Reptiles of Namibia
Reptiles described in 1849